Pacific Highway  may refer to:

 Pacific Highway (Australia) – Sydney, New South Wales to Brunswick Heads, New South Wales
 Pacific Highway (United States), the name of several highways in the United States
 Pacific Coast Highway (California), segments of State Route 1
 British Columbia Highway 15, known locally as the Pacific Highway in Canada

See also
 Pacific Motorway (Brisbane–Brunswick Heads) – Brunswick Heads, New South Wales to Brisbane, Queensland
 Pacific Motorway (Sydney–Newcastle) – Wahroonga, Sydney, New South Wales to Newcastle, New South Wales
 Pacific Coast Highway (disambiguation)
 Atlantic Highway (disambiguation)